Jesús Manuel de Lope Rebollo (born 8 January 1949 in Burgos, Spain) is a Spanish novelist. He lives and works in Madrid.

Works
Albertina en el país de los garamantes (1978)
El otoño del siglo (1981)
Shakespeare al anochecer (1992)
Octubre en el menú (1992)
Jardines de África (1992)
Bella en las tinieblas (1997)
El libro de piel de tiburón (1997)
Madrid Continental (1998)
Las perlas peregrinas (1998)
Música para tigres (1999)
La sangre ajena (2000), translated into English by John Cullen as The Wrong Blood (Other Press, 2010)
Iberia. La puerta iluminada (2004)
Iberia. La imagen múltiple (2005)
Otras islas (2009)
Azul sobre azul (2011)

External links
Other Press author page for Manuel de Lope
New York Times Book Review of The Wrong Blood

Spanish novelists
Spanish male novelists
1949 births
Living people